Losoong marks the end of harvest season, of the Bhutia tribe, celebrated every year in December.

Tradition 
Based on the Tibetan Lunar Calendar

 Losoong falls on the 18th day of the 10th month, when farmers celebrate the harvest. 
 It is a traditional festival of the Bhutias. It is a time when the farmers rejoice and celebrate their harvest. The Lepchas also celebrate it and call it Namsoong. It is celebrated by inviting freinds and family with traditional gaity and celebrations. 
 The festival have been adapted from the traditions and rituals of the Tibetan New Year, Losar. 
 The festival is conducted at the Phodong and Rumtek Monasteries in Sikkim.
 Namsoong festival is celebrated every year, in Upper Dzongu region at the confluence of river Teesta and Rongyung Chu.

Losoong is not only celebrated in India but its also celebrated in Nepal and Bhutan.

The dance forms performed in the festival depict narrativized tales from the life of Padmasambhava (or Guru Ugyen).

Celebration 
Celebration begins after the priest offers 'Chi-Fut', special alcohol, to the gods. After the offering to gods the effigy of the demon King is burnt. Burning the demon represents destroying the evil.

Certain competitions are organized and merrymaking lasts for several days. The festival is also called Sonam Losoong. Losoong festival is very famous in eastern India.

References

Sikkim
Tibetan festivals
Buddhist festivals in Nepal
Festivals in India
New Year in India
New Year celebrations
Cultural festivals in India
Religious festivals in India
Festivals in Bhutan
Festivals in Nepal
Buddhist festivals in India
Buddhist festivals in Bhutan